

List of tallest industrial buildings

See also
 List of tallest buildings and structures
 List of tallest chimneys
 List of tallest dams
 List of tallest oil platforms
 List of tallest cooling towers
 List of elevator test towers
 Lattice towers

References 

Industrial
Industrial buildings